are a Japanese football club based in the eastern part of Hiroshima, centered on the city of Fukuyama.  They play in the Chūgoku Soccer League, which part of Japanese Regional Leagues.

History 
Founded on 2017 as Fukuyama SCC (Fukuyama Sports Community Club), the club started their journey on the lower levels of Hiroshima Prefectural Leagues system.  Despite playing in the 5th tier of prefectural league football, on 2018, after winning the Hiroshima Prefectural Adult Final Tournament, they got instantly promoted to the 2nd division of the prefecture for the 2019 season.  

On 2019, the team changed its name into Fukuyama City FC. The club won back-to-back promotions with high-scoring matches, alongside an unbeaten streak that started on their foundation, on 2017, only being broken on 2022.  The club quickly established themselves as one of the quickest-developed clubs in Japanese football, jumping from the Prefectural League 5th Division to the Chugoku Soccer League in a five-season span. They played in the 2020 Emperor's Cup, where they won four matches to arrive at the quarter-finals. Uncommon feat for a young club (4-years old at the time), they successfully managed to win against teams of the 4th and 5th tier of Japanese football while being a Prefectural League club. They were only stopped by Blaublitz Akita, to whom they lost by 3-1 in a tough match.  

In 2022, Fukuyama City won the Chugoku Soccer League in their debut at Regional League level, qualifying them for the 2022 Regional Champions League. They finished second in their group but were eliminated from the tournament. If they had won or finished runners up in the tournament they would have been directly promoted to the 2023 Japan Football League. Promotion to the JFL would have helped to potentially fulfill their goal of joining the J3 League by 2024.

League and Cup record 

Key

Honours
Chugoku Soccer League (1): 2022
Hiroshima Prefectural League 1st Division (2): 2020, 2021
Hiroshima Prefectural League 2nd Division (1): 2019
Eastern Hiroshima Prefectural League (1): 2017, 2018
All Hiroshima Soccer Championship (3): 2020, 2021, 2022

Current squad

Coaching staff
For the 2023 season.

References

External links
Official Website

Football clubs in Japan
Association football clubs established in 2017
Sports teams in Hiroshima Prefecture
2017 establishments in Japan